The Game Awards 2020 was an award show that honored the best video games of 2020. It was produced and hosted by Geoff Keighley, and took place on December 10, 2020. The preshow ceremony was hosted by Sydnee Goodman. Unlike previous Game Awards, the show was broadcast virtually due to the COVID-19 pandemic; Keighley presented at a soundstage in Los Angeles, while musical performances took place virtually at stages in London and Tokyo. The show introduced the award's first Future Class, a list of individuals from the video game industry who best represent the future of video games, Innovation in Accessibility award, an award for games that featured notable accessibility options. The show was live streamed across 45 different platforms. It featured musical performances from the London Philharmonic Orchestra and Eddie Vedder, and presentations from celebrity guests, including Reggie Fils-Aimé, Gal Gadot, Brie Larson, and Keanu Reeves.

The Last of Us Part II received the most nominations and wins in the show's history—eleven and seven, respectively—and was awarded Game of the Year. Neil Druckmann and Halley Gross won Best Narrative for their work on the game, while Laura Bailey was awarded Best Performance for her role as Abby. Several new games were announced, including Ark II, Perfect Dark, and an untitled Mass Effect game. The show was the most expensive ceremony to date. It was viewed by over 83 million streams, the most in its history to date, with 8.3 million concurrent viewers at its peak. It received a mixed reception from media publications, with praise directed at new game announcements, and criticism for not allowing developers more time to speak. Some critics and viewers shared concerns over the success of The Last of Us Part II due to its developer's crunch practices.

Background 

As with previous iterations of The Game Awards, the 2020 show was hosted and produced by Canadian games journalist Geoff Keighley. He returned as an executive producer alongside Kimmie Kim, and Richard Preuss and LeRoy Bennett returned as director and creative director, respectively. Sydnee Goodman returned as host of the preshow. Due to the COVID-19 pandemic, Keighley did not want to host a normal ceremony. Not wanting to take a hiatus and inspired by the success of Summer Game Fest, he considered hosting from his home but his board urged him to attempt a larger show on par with previous years. In case of a significant surge of COVID-19 cases in California, the crew had several back-up plans, including broadcasting from Keighley's house. He worked with his partners to develop a virtual show; he and his team took inspiration from other shows throughout the year, including the Democratic National Convention, in which the "audience" was featured on virtual screens, as well as the 72nd Primetime Emmy Awards, wherein the hosts were isolated on stage and the winners accepted via video call.

The presentation used three soundstages in Los Angeles, London, and Tokyo; each had minimal attendees, mostly related to production crew and presenters. Keighley said this allowed them to include additional presentation events as with past shows, as well as explore taking future shows to different venues. The 2020 show—featuring a production of more than 400 people, six of whom are full-time employees—had a budget of under  and was the most expensive to date, partly due to the COVID-19 tests required for the crew and the worldwide remote camera set-ups. It remained profitable due to revenue from advertisers and sponsors, as well as minor earnings from streaming services. The show's theme was strength and comfort due to the impact of the pandemic. Keighley wanted to implore the theme of unity, given the release of the PlayStation 5 and Xbox Series X/S in November 2020; he cited The Game Awards 2018 as an example of this theme, which had led with Nintendo's Reggie Fils-Aimé, Microsoft's Phil Spencer, and Sony's Shawn Layden sharing the stage. Keighley felt the inclusion of film and television stars was an interesting way to show a wider appreciation for the industry. His team wanted to include Henry Cavill in the show, but he was busy working on The Witcher.

While developing the show, Keighley spoke to hundreds of viewers via Zoom to discuss their own interests, often alongside industry figures like Valve Corporation president Gabe Newell and Epic Games creative director Donald Mustard. As with the previous show, the presentation ran alongside the Game Festival, consisting of playable demos and additional in-game content. The show introduced the award's first Future Class, a list of individuals from across the video game industry who best represent the future of video games. The inductees included industry professionals such as Kinda Funny's Blessing Adeoye Jr., Naughty Dog's Halley Gross, and GameSpot Kallie Plagge. The presentation was aired on December 10, 2020, live streamed across more than 45 online platforms. It aired on more than ten networks in China, including Bilibili, Douyin, and Huya Live, and on several networks in India including Disney+ Hotstar, JioTV, and MX Player.

Announcements 
Around April and May in 2020, Keighley was worried about a potential lack of game announcements due to the impact of COVID-19 on the industry; however, several developers were able to submit their announcements and trailers for demonstration. Announcements on recently released and upcoming games were made for:

 Among Us
 Back 4 Blood
 Call of Duty: Black Ops Cold War
 Disco Elysium
 Dragon Age 4
 Fall Guys: Ultimate Knockout
 Fortnite
 Forza Horizon 4
 The Elder Scrolls Online
 It Takes Two
 Microsoft Flight Simulator
 Monster Hunter Rise
 Myst
 Nier Replicant ver.1.22474487139...
 Oddworld: Soulstorm
 Outriders
 Overcooked! All You Can Eat
 Returnal
 Scarlet Nexus
 Sea of Solitude
 Star Wars: Tales from the Galaxy's Edge
 Super Meat Boy Forever
 Super Smash Bros. Ultimate
 Warhammer 40,000: Darktide
 Warframe

New games announced during the ceremony included:

 Ark II
 The Callisto Protocol
 Century: Age of Ashes
 Crimson Desert
 Endless Dungeon
 Evil Dead: The Game
 Evil West
 F.I.S.T.: Forged In Shadow Torch
 Ghosts 'n Goblins Resurrection
 Loop Hero
 Untitled Mass Effect game
 Open Roads
 Perfect Dark
 Road 96
 Season: A Letter to the Future
 Shady Part of Me
 Tchia
 We Are OFK

Winners and nominees 

The nominees for The Game Awards 2020 were announced on November 18, 2020. Any game released on or before November 20, 2020 was eligible for consideration. The nominees were compiled by a jury panel with members from 96 media outlets globally; ballots were sent to outlets on October 29 and due back on November 6, though they had until November 13 to submit updated ballots. Outlets were required to submit three games for each category to determine the nominees. Winners were determined between the jury (90%) and public votes (10%); the latter was held via the official website and on social media platforms such as Facebook and Twitter, and closed on December 9. The two exceptions were the Most Anticipated Game and Player's Voice awards, which were fully nominated and voted-on by the public; the former was determined exclusively on Twitter and announced during the show, and the latter was announced on December 8 after several rounds of voting. A new Innovation in Accessibility award was added for games that featured notable accessibility options. Around 18.3 million people participated in the public vote, doubling from the previous show.

Awards 
Winners are listed first, highlighted in boldface, and indicated with a double dagger.

Video games

Esports and creators

Games with multiple nominations and awards

Multiple nominations 
The Last of Us Part II received eleven nominations, the most in the show's history. Other games with multiple nominations included Hades with nine, Ghost of Tsushima with eight, Final Fantasy VII Remake with six, and Doom Eternal with five. Sony Interactive Entertainment had 26 total nominations, more than any other publisher, followed by Supergiant Games and Xbox Game Studios with eight.

Multiple awards 
The Last of Us Part II received the most wins in the show's history, with seven. Four games—Among Us, Final Fantasy VII Remake, Ghost of Tsushima, and Hades—won two awards. Across its two winning games, Sony Interactive Entertainment won a total of nine awards, while Innersloth, Square Enix, Supergiant Games, and Xbox Game Studios won two.

Presenters and performers

Presenters 
The following individuals, listed in order of appearance, presented awards or introduced trailers. All other awards were presented by Keighley or Goodman.

Performers 
The following individuals or groups performed musical numbers. A planned orchestral version of Cyberpunk 2077s music was scrapped when the game was delayed to the same day as the ceremony, rendering it ineligible for nomination.

Ratings and reception

Nominees 
Inverses Corey Plante felt the cutoff date led to several games getting snubbed, including Demon's Souls and Marvel's Spider-Man: Miles Morales, as well as Pokémon Sword and Shield, which was eligible for both the 2019 and 2020 awards but was unrecognized in both. He felt Ghost of Tsushima was more deserving of a Best Score and Music nomination than Doom Eternal. Den of Geeks Matthew Byrd similarly lamented the lack of recognition for Demon's Souls and Marvel's Spider-Man: Miles Morales. Kat Bailey of USgamer questioned Doom Eternal nomination for Game of the Year, describing it as "messy, unfocused, and, well, just not as good" as its predecessor. Kotaku Australias Alex Walker similarly found the nomination misplaced and considered games like Half-Life: Alyx and Microsoft Flight Simulator more deserving.

Ceremony 
The show received a mixed reception from media publications. VentureBeat Dean Takahashi praised the ceremony, particularly applauding its celebration of diverse games such as The Last of Us Part II and Tell Me Why as well as the varied and interesting new game announcements. Todd Martens of Los Angeles Times felt the show should have allowed more time for the developers to speak and discuss their artistic visions behind the games, noting the presentation does little to demonstrate video games as art. Eurogamers Martin Robinson said the show was understandably "low-key" but called it a "three-hour long advert". Inverses Ana Diaz criticized the rapid announcement of winners between premieres and during the preshow, preventing developers from accepting the awards, and its focus on Hollywood actors over game creators.

Similar to concerns over Death Stranding predominance in the nominations and ceremony for the 2019 awards due to its creator Hideo Kojima's friendship with Keighley, some viewers shared concerns related to The Last of Us Part II at the 2020 awards, both for its awards success and due to the developer's crunch practices. The Last of Us Part II was well-received at release but narrative elements polarized some critics and players, and the game had been subject to review bombing; Keighley clarified the awards were not rigged in the manner some viewers had suggested and there was no influence of Naughty Dog or its staff on the award selection, citing the game's popularity among players and media alike as proven by its runner-up placement in the Player's Voice award. Kotaku Ian Walker criticized the game's Best Game Direction win, noting Hades should have won due to developer Supergiant Games's less demanding work culture. TheGamers Peter Glagowski similarly felt the game's awards were a message excusing crunch culture in game development. Keighley felt it would be difficult to incorporate criteria related to games developed under poor industry practices like crunch into the awards selection process without becoming a slippery slope, but believes discussions of these practices should be a conversation held by the larger community.

Viewership 
Over 83 million streams were used to view the ceremony, the most in the show's history to date, with 8.3 million concurrent viewers at its peak. On Twitch, the show had over 2.63 million concurrent viewers, more than double the previous year, with 9,000 creators co-streaming the ceremony. On YouTube, live viewership increased 84 percent over the previous year. In total, live hours viewed increased by over 129 percent across Facebook Gaming, Twitch, and YouTube. The show trended worldwide on Twitter, with a 31 percent increase in conversation from the previous year, while usage of the hashtag #TheGameAwards increased 107 percent. Keighley expressed his surprise by the consistent growth of the show over the years, but confessed it has led him to fear "that year where it doesn't grow ... There's going to be a year where we don't have the same viewers".

Notes

References

External links 
 

The Game Awards ceremonies
2020 awards in the United States
2020 in video gaming
2020 video game awards
Impact of the COVID-19 pandemic on the video game industry
December 2020 events in the United States